Fred Yakich (born 10 December 1941 in Sydney, New South Wales) is an Australian former rugby league footballer for the Manly in the New South Wales Rugby League premiership competition.

References

External links
Profile from NRL stats

Living people
Australian rugby league players
Manly Warringah Sea Eagles players
Rugby league centres
Rugby league players from Sydney
1941 births